J. T. Thomas may refer to:

J. T. Thomas (Survivor contestant), winner of Survivor: Tocantins
J. T. Thomas (defensive back), former American football defensive back
J. T. Thomas (linebacker), American football linebacker
J. T. Thomas (wide receiver), American football wide receiver
Jason "JT" Thomas, American jazz drummer and member of Forq